Marc Norman (born 1941 in Los Angeles, California) is an American screenwriter, novelist and playwright.

Early life
Norman graduated in 1964 with a M.A. in English Literature from the University of California.

Career
After working for Leonard Stern, David Suskind and Daniel Melnick, Norman wrote several features and television projects, including the TV movie The Challenge and an episode of the Mission: Impossible TV series. Other screenwriting credits include the films Oklahoma Crude (which he would later adapt into a novel), The Killer Elite  and The Aviator. In 1995, he was one of several writers hired to rewrite Cutthroat Island, at the behest of director Renny Harlin.

With Tom Stoppard, Norman won the Oscar for Best Original Screenplay at the 71st Academy Awards for his screenplay of Shakespeare in Love; the pair were also nominated for a BAFTA and received the Silver Bear for an outstanding single writing achievement at the 49th Berlin International Film Festival. He also shared a Best Picture Oscar for the film as co-producer. The original idea was suggested to Norman in the late 1980s by his son Zachary.

Books

Fiction

Nonfiction

References

External links
 
 Official Website

1941 births
Alexander Hamilton High School (Los Angeles) alumni
American male screenwriters
Best Original Screenplay Academy Award winners
Living people
Filmmakers who won the Best Film BAFTA Award
Producers who won the Best Picture Academy Award
Writers Guild of America Award winners
Best Screenplay Golden Globe winners
Golden Globe Award-winning producers
People from Los Angeles
Screenwriters from California